A Starter tenancy is a type of tenancy in the United Kingdom which are offered by some housing associations. They are trial tenancies and tenants are easier to evict during this period.

See also
Demoted tenancy

References

Housing in the United Kingdom
Tenancies in the United Kingdom